Luigi Consonni (born 7 February 1977) is an Italian former footballer who last played as a midfielder for Italian club Grosseto in Serie B.

Career
A native of Lombardy, Consonni started his career at the Italian team Juventus. He joined Serie C1 team Fiorenzuola in 1996. He spent the next five years playing at Serie C1 and Serie C2 (Fiorenzuola and Rimini).

On 21 June 2002 he joined Serie B team Cosenza.

He joined Napoli in 2005 and finally Grosseto, his last professional team. With the maremmani he played 198 games and scored 10 goals as team's captain.

He played for amateur teams Albinia and Roselle, before his retirement in 2017.

External links
 
 Profile at AIC.Football.it 

1977 births
Living people
People from Seregno
Italian footballers
Serie B players
Juventus F.C. players
U.S. Pistoiese 1921 players
F.C. Grosseto S.S.D. players
Rimini F.C. 1912 players
Cosenza Calcio 1914 players
S.S.C. Napoli players
U.S. Salernitana 1919 players
S.P.A.L. players
Association football midfielders
Footballers from Lombardy
Sportspeople from the Province of Monza e Brianza